Malook Wali is a village in district Ghotki North side of the Mirpur Mathelo its zip code is 65041 it is located at 28°08'13.3"N 69°32'17.3"E

References

Villages in Ghotki District